This article features a list of events in chess during the year 2013, as well as the FIDE top ten ranked players in September of that year.

2013 tournaments

This is a list of significant 2013 chess tournaments:

Key dates
 1 April – Magnus Carlsen wins the right to challenge Viswanathan Anand for the 2013 World Chess Championship after winning the Candidates Tournament on tiebreaks.

FIDE World Rankings

The FIDE World Rankings as of September 2013 were:

References

 
21st century in chess
Chess by year